The  is a temple of the Shingon sect in Ono, Hyōgo, Japan. 
It was first established by Chōgen in 1190 – 1198, and the temple structures have undergone several reconstruction efforts since then, with the last reconstruction taking place in 1632.

Jōdo-ji's Jōdodō completed in 1194 is a National Treasure of Japan. 
The architecture is in the Daibutsu style that combines Japanese and Chinese elements.

List of buildings 
Jōdodō – built in 1194.　National Treasure of Japan.
Yakushiō (Main hall) – Important Cultural Property of Japan. It was rebuilt in 1517.
Hachiman-jinja honden – Important Cultural Property of Japan.
Hachiman-jinja haiden – Important Cultural Property of Japan.
Kaizanō – rebuilt in 1520.
Bell tower – rebuilt in 1632.
Fudodō
Monjudō
Kyozō

List of sculptures 
Amitabha Triad – National Treasure of Japan. Kaikei's most important work. It is a work in 1195–1197. Height: 24.6 ft 
Amitabha – Important Cultural Property of Japan. Kaikei's work. It is a work in 1201. Loaned to Nara National Museum. 
Chōgen- Important Cultural Property of Japan. (1234)
Buddhist saint's mask, 25 pieces – Important Cultural Property of Japan. It is a work of Kaikei's school.

List of craftwork 
Hand drum made of copper – Important Cultural Property of Japan. (1194).
Gorintō made of copper – Important Cultural Property of Japan. (1194).
Table – Important Cultural Property of Japan.

List of paintings 
Nirvana – Important Cultural Property of Japan.
Shingon's eight saints – Important Cultural Property of Japan.

See also 
National Treasures of Japan
List of National Treasures of Japan (sculptures)

Gallery

Citations

External links 

神戸大学附属図書館「浄土寺縁起」 (Japanese)

1190s establishments in Japan
National Treasures of Japan
Important Cultural Properties of Japan
Shingon Buddhism
Kōyasan Shingon temples
Buddhist temples in Hyōgo Prefecture
Tourist attractions in Hyōgo Prefecture